The 2010 Iowa Barnstormers season was the 10th season for the franchise, and the sixth in the Arena Football League, after three total seasons from 2001–2009 in the AF2, which dissolved following the 2009 season. The team was coached by John Gregory and played their home games at Wells Fargo Arena. The Barnstormers failed to make the playoffs when they finished the regular season 6th in the National Conference with a 7–9 record.

Standings

Regular season schedule
The Barnstormers began the season at home against the Rush on April 2. Their final regular season game was on the road against the Rattlers on July 31.

All times are CDT

Roster

Regular season

Week 1: vs. Chicago Rush

Chicago's DeJuan Alfonzo returned an interception from Brian Villanueva for a touchdown on Iowa's first play from scrimmage, sparking the visiting Rush to a 17–0 first-quarter lead. The Barnstormers turned the ball over six times in their first Arena Football League contest since 2000. After Iowa inserted Ryan Vena at quarterback for the second quarter trailing 17–0, he tossed touchdown passes to Jesse Schmidt and Todd Blythe to close the gap to 34–22 by halftime; however, Chicago would shut Iowa out in the third quarter and score early in the fourth to push the advantage to 47–22. A Vena pass to Blythe and a Vena run pulled Iowa to within 47–37 with six minutes remaining, but Chicago's Russ Michna hit Kenny Higgins to put the game out of reach, sending a record crowd of 12,184 fans home unhappy.

Week 2: BYE

Week 3: at Milwaukee Iron

Two Midwestern foes found themselves head to head this weekend. The Iowa Barnstormers traveled to Milwaukee, Wisconsin to take on the Iron in their first of two meetings this season. Milwaukee won their home opener in front of the crowd of 5,032 Iron faithful. QB Chris Greisen continued his dominance at the quarterback position, throwing 25-of-36 for 382 yards and seven touchdowns. Greisen has yet to throw an interception this season. While Greisen continues to shine, it is his offensive counterparts that are successful in bringing the ball into the end zone. WRs Nate Forse and Anthony “Tiger” Jones have proven to be Greisen’s perfect receiving duo. Jones brought in three touchdowns on 12 catches for 171 yards this weekend, while Forse made 10 catches for 146 yards and three scores. Greisen’s seventh touchdown was caught by Alvance Robinson. Not to be outdone, Milwaukee’s defense also helped to hold off and Barnstormers serge. Marcus Everett intercepted QB Ryan Vena’s first possession of the game, eventually leading to an Iron score. Milwaukee managed to pull ahead 13–0 before the Barnstormers got into the game. WR Todd Blythe, known for his athletic catches, caught a pass deep in the corner of the end zone to bring the score to 6–13, but Milwaukee would never once trail throughout the game.

Iowa’s QB Vena was intercepted twice, including a game-highlighting play. Milwaukee’s Virgil Gray nabbed an erratic Vena pass in the end zone, not only disrupting a score for the Barnstormers, but also proceeded to run the ball back 58 yards for a score of his own. Despite two players leaving with injuries in the second half, Milwaukee was able to hold off the Barnstormers and come away with the 17-point win.

Week 4: vs. Oklahoma City Yard Dawgz

Iowa gave up a touchdown on the game's opening drive on a 15-yard touchdown pass. The Barnstormers also scored a touchdown on their first possession, but the extra point was blocked and eventually taken into the end zone by the Yard Dawgz for 2 points. The ensuing kickoff return was fumbled and Iowa recovered the ball and took it in for a touchdown. Down at the half by 4 points, Iowa briefly held the lead in the 3rd quarter, but by the end of the quarter, they were still down by 4 points. Ryan Vena had a 31-yard passing touchdown, and also took one in himself, giving the Barnstormers a 54–44 lead in the 4th quarter. Oklahoma City scored a touchdown with 23 seconds left in the game, and attempted an onside kick down 7 points. Iowa took the onside kick and returned it for a touchdown, effectively sealing the win for their first victory of the season. Vena finished the game with 217 passing yards and 7 total touchdowns. Jesse Schmidt was the top receiver with 141 yards and 3 touchdowns.

Week 5: at Orlando Predators

The Barnstormers won their second straight game with a win in Orlando. In the 4th quarter, up by 7 points and inside the Predators' 10-yard line, Ryan Vena was intercepted by Marlon Moye-Moore. The Predators drove all the way to Iowa's 9-yard line, but the Barnstormer defense was able to come up with a stop as the Predators threw four straight incomplete passes. Following the turnover on downs, Vena connected with Jesse Schmidt on a 40-yard pass for a touchdown. With 1:17 remaining, the Predators were unable to make a comeback, giving Iowa the win. Vena finished the game with 236 passing yards and 4 passing touchdowns, though he threw a season-high 3 interceptions. Jesse Schmidt was once again the leading receiver, with 116 yards and 2 touchdowns.

Week 6: vs. Cleveland Gladiators

The Barnstormers jumped out to a lead of 12 points in the 2nd quarter, but the Gladiators cut it down to 36–35 at the half. Iowa's offense was unable to keep up with Cleveland's in the 2nd half, and after giving up the lead by allowing a 4-yard touchdown pass shortly before the end of the 3rd quarter, the Barnstormers never led the rest of the game, eventually losing by a score of 70–56. Ryan Vena barely completed half of his passes, with only a pair touchdown passes in the game. On the ground however, Vena compiled 30 yards and 4 touchdowns. Todd Blythe was the leading receiver with 6 catches for 131 yards and a touchdown.

Week 7: at Chicago Rush

Week 8: vs. Arizona Rattlers

Week 9: BYE

Week 10: vs. Alabama Vipers

Week 11: at Bossier–Shreveport Battle Wings

Week 12: at Cleveland Gladiators

Week 13: vs. Utah Blaze

Week 14: at Dallas Vigilantes

Week 15: at Oklahoma City Yard Dawgz

Week 16: vs. Spokane Shock

Week 17: vs. Milwaukee Iron

Week 18: at Arizona Rattlers

References

Iowa Barnstormers
Iowa Barnstormers seasons
Barn